The Upper Steel Arch Bridge, also known as the Honeymoon Bridge or Fallsview Bridge (less frequently Falls View Bridge), was an international bridge which crossed the Niagara River, connecting Niagara Falls, Ontario, Canada, with Niagara Falls, New York, United States. It was located about  upriver of the present-day Rainbow Bridge. It collapsed in 1938.

History
Built in 1897–98 by the Pencoyd Bridge Company, the Upper Steel Arch Bridge was located  closer to the American Falls than the bridge that it replaced. When completed, the bridge became the largest steel arch bridge in the world. Its features included a double track for trolley cars and room for carriages and pedestrians. The bridge had to be constantly protected from ice bridges that formed over the river every winter. In January 1899 a huge ice bridge threatened the bridge when ice piled around its abutments due to their close proximity to the river's surface.

The protection around the abutments held for about another forty years, until January 27, 1938, when the bridge collapsed. Final collapse occurred at 4:20 pm, before thousands of onlookers who had come to watch the bridge go. The structure collapsed in one piece into the river. Demolition of what was left of the bridge took place from February to April 1938 when all of the pieces were either removed or had sunk. Construction of a replacement bridge was undertaken shortly thereafter, this time with the abutments much higher off the river. It was named the Rainbow Bridge and opened in November 1941.

Gallery

References

External links

 CBC Radio Archives Announcing the collapse of the bridge (1938)

Bridges in Niagara Falls, Ontario
Bridge disasters in Canada
Bridge disasters caused by engineering error
Bridge disasters caused by maintenance error
Bridge disasters in the United States
Transportation disasters in New York (state)
Bridges completed in 1898
Open-spandrel deck arch bridges in Canada
Open-spandrel deck arch bridges in the United States
Steel bridges in the United States
Steel bridges in Canada
Road bridges in New York (state)
1938 disasters in Canada
1938 disasters in the United States